Hufsmith is an unincorporated community in  Harris County, Texas, United States. The community is part of the Tomball metropolitan area

Education
Tomball Independent School District operates schools serving the community.

One elementary school, Tomball Elementary School, serves Hufsmith elementary school residents. The school includes a bilingual program. Two intermediate schools (Beckendorf and Tomball), Tomball Junior High School, and Tomball High School also serve Tomball.

References

External links

Unincorporated communities in Harris County, Texas
Unincorporated communities in Texas